The 1980 U.S. Pro Tennis Championships was a men's tennis tournament played on outdoor green clay courts at the Longwood Cricket Club in Chestnut Hill, Massachusetts in the  United States. The event was part of the 1980 Volvo Grand Prix circuit. It was the 53rd edition of the tournament and was held from July 14 through July 20, 1980. Fourth-seeded Eddie Dibbs won the singles title.

Finals

Singles
 Eddie Dibbs defeated  Gene Mayer 6–2, 6–1
 It was Dibbs' 2nd singles title of the year and the 20th of his career.

Doubles
 Sandy Mayer /  Gene Mayer defeated  Hans Gildemeister /  Andrés Gómez 1–6, 6–4, 6–4

References

External links
 ITF tournament edition details
 Longwood Cricket Club – list of U.S. Pro Champions

U.S. Pro Tennis Championships
U.S. Pro Championships
U.S. Pro Championships
U.S. Pro Championships
U.S. Pro Championships
Chestnut Hill, Massachusetts
Clay court tennis tournaments
History of Middlesex County, Massachusetts
Sports in Middlesex County, Massachusetts
Tennis tournaments in Massachusetts
Tourist attractions in Middlesex County, Massachusetts